Perumkunnil Junction (also known as VazhanasalaMukk) is a small village in Pathanamthitta district, Travancore region, Kerala, India. It is on the route between Aranmula (famous for its boat races) and Pathanamthitta (en route to the holy pilgrimage destination of Sabarimala). The majority of its inhabitants are from Hindu and Christian backgrounds. It is well connected to various places such as Chengannur (9 km), Pandalam (8 km), Aranmula (5 km), Kozhencherry (8.5 km), Pathanamthitta (14 km) by different roads.

Nearby Towns

 Pandalam,
 Kulanada,
 Pathanamthitta,
 Kozhencherry,
 Aranmula,
 Kidangannur,
 Elavumthitta,
 Chengannur,
 Thiruvalla,
 Mezhuveli

Places of Importance

 Mezhuveli Vazhanasala
 Corporation Bank
 G.I.S UP School
 Holy Innocent Orthodox church, Mezhuveli
India Pentecostal Church of God
Assemblies of God in India
 St. George Jacobite Church (Malankavu Palli)
 Syrian Malankara Catholic Church (Reeth Palli)
 Kidangannoor Market 
 Aringottu Kavu
 Pallimukkathamma Devi Temple

References 

Villages in Pathanamthitta district